Bret John Haaland (born August 10, 1964) is an American animator, storyboard artist, director, and producer.

Awards and nominations
Won Emmy Award Outstanding Children's Animated Program
All Hail King Julien (2014)

Won Emmy Award Outstanding Children's Animated Program
Kung Fu Panda: Legends of Awesomeness (2014)

Won Emmy Award Outstanding Children's Animated Program
Kung Fu Panda: Legends of Awesomeness (2013)

Won Emmy Award Outstanding Animated Program
The Penguins of Madagascar: The Return of The Revenge of Dr. Blowhole (2012)

Won Emmy Award Outstanding Children's Animated Program
The Penguins of Madagascar (2012)

Won Emmy Award Outstanding Children's Animated Program
The Penguins of Madagascar (2011)

Won Emmy Award Outstanding Special Class Animated Program
The Penguins of Madagascar (2010)

Haaland worked on The Simpsons during the first season as a layout artist. He has directed episodes of The Critic, Futurama and Father of the Pride. He served as supervising director for Futurama during the second season and as a director for the rest of the show.

He also directed the bonus Looney Tunes short "The Whizzard of Ow" on the Looney Tunes: Back In Action DVD.

Back as a student at CalArts, Haaland worked on Jim Reardon's student animation film Bring Me the Head of Charlie Brown.

Directing credits

The Critic episodes
 "Dial 'M' for Mother"
 "L.A. Jay"
 "A Pig Boy and His Dog"
 "Dukerella"

Futurama episodes
 "I, Roommate"
 "Mars University"
 "A Head in the Polls"
 "The Deep South"
 "That's Lobstertainment!"
 "Anthology of Interest II"
 "Teenage Mutant Leela's Hurdles"
 "The Devil's Hands Are Idle Playthings"

Father of the Pride episodes
 "Donkey"
 "Catnip and Trust"

All Hail King Julien episodes
 "He Blinded Me with Science"

External links
 

1964 births
Living people
American animators
California Institute of the Arts alumni
Place of birth missing (living people)
American animated film directors
American animated film producers